Nithiravilai is a small  town in Kanyakumari district, in Kollemcode MunicipaliltyTamil Nadu, India. It is a  business city which caters its day to day needs and borders the state of Kerala. The Kerala border from the village is approximately 3 km. It is about 14 km from Marthandam and 9 km south to Kaliyakkavilai.

Villages in Kanyakumari district